A shift register lookup table, also shift register LUT or SRL, refers to a component in digital circuitry. It is essentially a shift register of variable length. The length of SRL is set by driving address pins high or low and can be changed dynamically, if necessary.

The SRL component is used in FPGA devices.
The SRL can be used as a programmable delay element.

See also
Lookup table
Shift register

References

Digital electronics
Electronic engineering
Digital systems
Logic gates
Computer memory
Digital registers